"Тих бял Дунав се вълнува" ("Still White Danube Undulates") also known as the Botev March, is a popular Bulgarian patriotic song. The lyrics are based on that of a poem by Ivan Vazov titled Radetzky after the steamship seized by the rebels. The storyline recounts a historically accurate incident from the Bulgarian struggles against Ottoman rule, which has earned the status of modern myth for Bulgarians, to some degree due to this song. On 29 May 1876 Bulgarian revolutionary and poet Hristo Botev at the head of 205-strong company of rebels seized control of the Austro-Hungarian passenger steamship Radetzky by armed force and used it to cross the Danube from Romania to the Bulgarian territories of the Ottoman Empire in order to join the April Uprising. Dagobert Engländer, Captain of the Radetzky, later recounted that "he had rarely met a man so impressive or energetic as Botev". The melody was composed by vocalist Ivan Karadzhov, according to his biography. In some performances of the song, the fourth verse is omitted.

Text

Notes

References

Bulgarian patriotic songs
Bulgarian songs
Bulgarian poems
April Uprising of 1876